Metro-Goldwyn-Mayer Animation (or MGM Animation for short) was the animation division of the Metro-Goldwyn-Mayer motion picture studio in Hollywood, California, that specializes in animated productions for theatrical features and television. It was established in 1993 and primarily involved in producing children's entertainment based upon MGM's ownership of properties, such as The Pink Panther, The Lionhearts, The Secret of NIMH, and All Dogs Go to Heaven. 

The founders, Paul Sabella and Jonathan Dern, left the company in 1999 and founded SD Entertainment. The studio has been dormant in 2002, ever since then.

Filmography

Theatrical

Direct-to-video

TV series

Miscellaneous productions 
 The Adventures of Hyperman (1995) (video game)

Unproduced projects 
 The Betty Boop Movie. In 1993, there were plans for an animated musical feature film of Betty Boop  to be MGM Animation's first theatrical animated film, but the plans were later canceled. The musical storyboard scene of the proposed film can be seen online. The finished reel consists of Betty and her estranged father performing a jazz number together called "Where are you?" Jimmy Rowles and Sue Raney provide the vocals for Betty and Benny Boop. Latter All Dogs Go to Heaven 2 became MGM Animation's only theatrical animated film.
 Noah. According to Animation Magazine, MGM Animation had plans to do a theatrical animated film adaption of comedian Bill Cosby's famous stand up sketch of his take of Noah's Ark with Cosby producing, co-writing the script with Charles Kipps and as the voice of God, while Mel Brooks, Carl Reiner and Jonathan Winters were in talks to voice Noah. However the project was canceled after Cosby's previous films were both commercial and critically failures and more people were becoming aware of  Cosby's sex abuse cases.
 Stargate: The Young Explorers. In 1997, Stargate: The Young Explorers was a proposed direct-to-video movie based on MGM's Stargate franchise that was announced to be in development alongside Babes in Toyland and The Secret of Nimh II. While the movie was never produced it's possible some of the concepts were incorporated into the animated series Stargate: Infinity.

See also 
 List of Metro-Goldwyn-Mayer theatrical animated feature films
 Metro-Goldwyn-Mayer cartoon studio
 MGM Animation/Visual Arts
 SD Entertainment

References 

Metro-Goldwyn-Mayer Animation
American animation studios
American companies established in 1993
Metro-Goldwyn-Mayer subsidiaries
Entertainment companies based in California
Companies based in Los Angeles
Entertainment companies established in 1993
Mass media companies established in 1993
1993 establishments in California
Mass media companies disestablished in 2002
Former Metro-Goldwyn-Mayer subsidiaries